Sultan Jamalul-Kiram I was a Sultan of Sulu from 1823 to 1844. As per some sources, his real name was Muwalil Wasit (cousin to Brunei Sultan Nasiruddin). Muwalil Wasit was the son of Alimud-Din III.

The Sultan died in 1844.

References

See also
 List of sultans of Sulu

Sultans of Sulu
1844 deaths
Year of birth missing